The Journal of Obstetric, Gynecologic, & Neonatal Nursing is a peer-reviewed nursing journal in the fields of obstetrical nursing, women's health nursing, and neonatal nursing. It is the official publication of the Association of Women's Health, Obstetric and Neonatal Nurses.

Abstracting and indexing 
The journal is covered by the following abstracting and indexing services: CAB Health/CABDirect, CINAHL, Current Contents/Clinical Medicine, Current Contents/Social & Behavioral Sciences, Index Medicus/MEDLINE, PubMed, ProQuest, PsycINFO, Science Citation Index Expanded, Scopus, and the Social Sciences Citation Index. According to the Journal Citation Reports, the Journal of Obstetric, Gynecologic, & Neonatal Nursing has a 2016 impact factor of 1.261, ranking it 40 out of 112 in "Nursing", and 65 out of 79 in "Obstetrics & Gynecology".

References

External links 
 
 Association of Women's Health, Obstetric and Neonatal Nurses

Obstetrical nursing journals
Pediatric nursing journals
English-language journals
Wiley-Blackwell academic journals
Publications established in 1972
Bimonthly journals
Women's health nursing journals